McDonald Creek may refer to:

McDonald Creek Provincial Park, a park in Canada
McDonald Creek (Walker County, Texas), a stream in Texas, U.S.
McDonald Creek (Salt Fork Brazos River tributary), a stream in Texas, U.S.